The Port of Timișoara is a former commercial port located on the Bega Canal and, of Romania's 30 inland ports, is the only one not located on the Danube river.

History
The Port of Timișoara dates back to 1860. At the time, the port headquarters were located on the left bank of Bega in the Iosefin district. The shore offered  of space where barges could be moored. The Iosefin water tower was located in the middle section of the right bank.

A harbourmaster was added in 1928. The harbourmaster managed the harbour and port and controlled Otelec which, through the Bega Canal, provided a connection between Bega and Regensburg. This connection facilitated the transport of agricultural products from Banat to Vienna via the Rhine river, as well as the Adriatic coast. Access to the Rhine meant access to the North Sea which ensured a thriving trade.

After the Second World War, navigation to the Bega was significantly reduced and the freight transport channel was eventually abandoned in 1960. Commercial and passenger ships were withdrawn seven years later.

References

External links

Ports and harbours of Romania
Timișoara